Megakaryocyte–rythrocyte progenitor cells, among other blood cells, are generated as a result of hematopoiesis, which occurs in the bone marrow. Hematopoietic stem cells can differentiate into one of two progenitor cells: the common lymphoid progenitor and the common myeloid progenitor. MEPs derive from the common myeloid progenitor lineage. Megakaryocyte/erythrocyte progenitor cells must commit to becoming either platelet-producing megakaryocytes via megakaryopoiesis or erythrocyte-producing erythroblasts via erythropoiesis. Most of the blood cells produced in the bone marrow during hematopoiesis come from megakaryocyte/erythrocyte progenitor cells.

References

Cell biology